The Lebanese People's Party was the first formally organized communist party in the Arab world. It was established 24 October 1924 by nine people, prominent among them Joseph Berger-Barzilai, Yusuf Ibrahim Yazbak and Fuad Shamali. The LPP published the leftist weekly newspaper al-Insaniyyah ("Humanity"), also the first of its kind in the Arab world. The first edition was published 15 May 1925, but it lasted only five issues as the French colonial authorities shut it down on 16 June 1925.

The LPP later merged with the Armenian group "Spartacus" to create the Syrian–Lebanese Communist Party. The first meeting of the new party, which was attended by 15 representatives, was held in secret on 9 December 1925.

References

 Ismael, Tareq Y., and Jacqueline S. Ismael. The Communist Movement in Syria & Lebanon. Gainesville: University Press of Florida, 1998.

Communist parties in Lebanon
Defunct political parties in Lebanon
Lebanese Communist Party
Political parties established in 1924